Phidippus pius is a species of jumping spider that is found in Central America and North America. Its range extends from the Eastern United States (excluding New England), west to Arizona, and south to Costa Rica. The color pattern of this species varies. Females are yellow to orange while males are orange to red.

Name
The species name is derived from the Latin word pius or "pious", meaning dutiful, godly, or holy.

Gallery

References

External links

 More pictures of P. pius at BugGuide

Salticidae
Spiders of Central America
Spiders of North America
Spiders described in 1905